Richard St George (c.1550–1635) was an English officer of arms.

Richard St George may also refer to:
Richard St George (died 1726) (1657–1726), Irish landowner
Richard Mansergh St George (1757–1798), British Army officer

See also
Richard George (disambiguation)